was a Japanese track and field athlete. She competed in the women's discus throw at the 1936 Summer Olympics. She won the silver medal at the 1951 Asian Games and won seven national titles, with four consecutive wins from 1937 to 1940 and three straight titles at the Japan Championships in Athletics from 1946 to 1948.

See also
List of Asian Games medalists in athletics

References

1916 births
1996 deaths
Place of birth missing
Japanese female discus throwers
Japanese female shot putters
Olympic female discus throwers
Olympic athletes of Japan
Athletes (track and field) at the 1936 Summer Olympics
Asian Games medalists in athletics (track and field)
Asian Games silver medalists for Japan
Athletes (track and field) at the 1951 Asian Games
Medalists at the 1951 Asian Games
Japan Championships in Athletics winners
20th-century Japanese women